The Football Federation of the 2nd Department San Pedro (Federación de Fútbol Segundo Departamento San Pedro) is the departamental governing body of football (soccer) in the department of San Pedro, in Paraguay. The federation is responsible for the organization of football leagues in the different cities of the department and it is also the regulator of the clubs. The main office of this federation is located in the city of San Pedro.

Tournaments for each league of this federation are played every year to determine the best teams. Afterwards, the champions of each league face each other to determine the best team in the department, with the overall winner being promoted to a higher division in the Paraguayan football league system.

Leagues in San Pedro

Liga Aguaray de Fútbol
The Liga Aguaray de Fútbol is based in the city of Lima. The following teams are part of this league:
 Atlético Limpeño
 Mariscal López
 15 de Mayo
 Mayor Hermosa
 Sportivo Número Uno
 Aquidaban
 Jovenes Unidos
 Sportivo San Antonio

Liga Deportiva Capiibary
The Liga Deportiva Capiibary is based in the city of Capiibary. The following teams are part of this league:
 Atlético Universal
 26 de Febrero
 Sportivo 1 de Marzo
 4 de Mayo
 Sportivo Capiibary
 Colonos Unidos
 1 de Mayo
 1 de Marzo
 14 de Mayo
 Nueva Estrella
 Atlético Central
 3 de Noviembre
 24 de Junio
 24 de Mayo

Liga Deportiva de Choré
The Liga Deportiva de Choré is based in the city of Choré. The following teams are part of this league:
 Sol de Mayo
 Dr. Juan Manuel Frutos
 Coronel Panchito López
 Sportivo Coe Pyta
 13 de Mayo FBC
 General Caballero
 El Porvenir
 Santa Elena
 6 de Enero
 Nueva Estrella
 El Millonario de Nuclear N° 3
 Sportivo Cocuera FBC

Liga Gral. Aquino de Fútbol
The Liga Gral. Aquino de Fútbol is based in the city of General Aquino. The following teams are part of this league:
 24 de Mayo
 1 de Marzo
 Teniente Turo
 Cerro Porteño
 12 de Agosto
 6 de Enero
 Olimpia
 Sportivo Ñumbue
 Sportivo San Blas
 8 de Diciembre
 Cerro León
 13 de Diciembre
 General Aquino
 Mariscal Estigarribia
 Guaraní
 12 de Junio
 Sportivo Luqueño
 Sportivo Corralense

Liga Deportiva Gral. Resquín
The Liga Deportiva Gral. Resquín is based in the city of Gral. Resquin. The following teams are part of this league:
 Universal
 Atlético Central
 Union Nacional
 8 de Diciembre
 Atletico Quiindy
 Solar de San Vicente
 1 de Enero
 20 de Julio
 Atletico Central
 8 de Diciembre
 3 de Febrero
 San José Central
 13 de Mayo

Liga Germanina de Deportes
The Liga Germanina de Deportes is based in the city of Nueva Germania. The following teams are part of this league:
 Cerro Porteño
 Sportivo 24 de Junio
 15 de Agosto FBC
 Atletico Aguaray Mi
 3 de Mayo
 Olimpia

Liga Deportiva de Guayaybí
The Liga Deportiva de Guayaybí is based in the city of Guayaybí. The following teams are part of this league:
 Hijos de Defensores del Chaco
 Raza Guaraní
 29 de Junio
 Atletico River Plate
 8 de Diciembre
 12 de Junio
 Nueva Estrella
 8 de Diciembre
 Mariscal Estigarribia
 Sportivo Amistad
 Atletico Independiente
 Sportivo Santo Domingo

Liga Residenta de Fútbol
The Liga Residenta de Fútbol is based in the city of Itacurubí del Rosario. The following teams are part of this league:
 Cerro Porteño
 Sportivo Itacurubi
 12 de Octubre
 General Caballero
 Mariscal Estigarribia
 Libertad FBC
 Sportivo Lujan
 Deportivo Sol de Mayo
 Sportivo San Luis
 Sportivo Morel
 Atlético General Stroessner

Liga Rosarina de Deportes
The Liga Rosarina de Deportes is based in the city of Villa del Rosario. The following teams are part of this league:
 Cerro Corá
 Mariscal López
 General Stroessner
 Sol de Mayo
 Rosario Central
 Independiente
 24 de Noviembre
 Defensores del Chaco

Liga Sampedrana de Deportes
The Liga Sampedrana de Deportes is based in the city of San Pedro Ycuamandyyú. The following teams are part of this league:
 Libertad
 29 de Junio
 General Caballero FBC
 1 de Marzo
 General Marcial Samaniego FBC
 Atletico Nanawa
 Sportivo Villa Mercedes
 Sportivo Santa Rosa

Liga Santaniana de Deportes
The Liga Santaniana de Deportes is based in the city of San Estanislao. The following teams are part of this league:
 Olimpia
 Mariscal Lopez FBC
 Monte Alto
 Union Agricola
 13 de Noviembre
 Atletico Defensores
 Coronel Vicente Mongelos FBC
 Sportivo San Lorenzo
 8 de Diciembre
 Sport Mboiy F.C.

Liga Deportiva Yataíty Corá
The Liga Deportiva Yataíty Corá is based in the city of Yataity Corá. The following teams are part of this league:
 3 de Mayo
 Libertad
 8 de Diciembre
 6 de Enero
 24 de Junio
 Olimpia
4 de octubre de mboiy

Liga Santarroseña de Deportes
The Liga Santarroseña de Deportes is based in the city of Yataity Corá. The following teams are part of this league:
 29 de Junio
 Atletico Central
 Atletico Loma Pucú
 Hijos del Norte
 S.D. San Ramón
 Juventud Unido
 Sportivo 4 de Diciembre
 Agro Sport Prosperidad
 Atletico Kororo-í

External links
 UFI Website

San Pedro
San Pedro Department, Paraguay